James Stirling was a Scottish professional association footballer who played as an inside forward. He played two matches in the English Football League for Burnley in the 1895–96 season.

References

Scottish footballers
Association football forwards
Burnley F.C. players
English Football League players
Year of death missing
Year of birth missing